Sankar is a Sanskrit word meaning "beneficent" or "giver of bliss". Shankar is also the name of Hindu god, Lord Shiva (Shiva shankara). The south Indian version of Shankara is sometimes written as "Sankara".

Notable people with this name include:

Given name 
 Sankar (writer) (Mani Shankar Mukherjee), Bengali writer
 Shankar Balasubramanian, UK Chemical Biologist
 Shankar Bhattacharyya (born 1946), American engineer
 Shankar Lamichhane, Nepalese Essayist
 Shankar Mahadevan, singer and part of the Shankar-Ehsaan-Loy music-director trio
 Shankar Nagar, Nepalese town
 Shankar Painter (1946–2020), Indian poet
 Shankar (actor) (Shankar Panikkar, born 1960), Indian film actor and director popularly known as Shankar
 K. Shankar Pillai (1902–1989), Indian cartoonist
 Shankar Singh Raghuvanshi, half of the Shankar Jaiksan music-director duo 
 Shankar Dayal Sharma (1918–1999), ninth President of India serving from 1992 to 1997
 Shankar Tucker, American clarinetist and music composer
 Shankar Vedantam, reporter with NPR and host of 'Hidden Brain' podcast

Surname 
 Adrian Shankar, English cricketer
 Amala Shankar (1919–2020), Indian danseuse
 Anand Shankar, Tamil film director and writer
 Ananda Shankar (1942–1999), Bengali musician best known for fusing Western and Eastern musical styles. He was married to Tanusree Shankar
 Anoushka Shankar (born 1981), Indian sitar player and composer in the United States, daughter of Ravi Shankar
 Shankar (Tamil militant) (Colonel Shankar, nom de guerre), Vaithilingam Sornalingam of the Liberation Tigers of Tamil Eelam
 K. Shankar, Tamil film director
 L. Shankar (born 1950), Indian violinist
 Mamata Shankar (born 1955), actress in the Bengali language film industry of India
 Mani Shankar, Indian film-maker
 Melinda Shankar (born 1992), Canadian actress
 N. Shankar, Telugu film director
 Naren Shankar, writer, producer and director of several television series
 Geethali Norah Jones Shankar (Norah Jones, born 1979), American singer-songwriter, daughter of Ravi Shankar
 Ramamurti Shankar, physicist
 Ramsewak Shankar (1937), President of Suriname
 Ravi Shankar (1920–2012), famous sitar player
 Ravi Shankar (poet), poet and faculty member of Central Connecticut State University
 S. Shankar, Tamil film director
 Ravi Shankar (spiritual leader), guru and founder of the Art of Living movement
 Uday Shankar (1900–1977), classical dancer
 Sankar (writer & director) (V. R. Shankar), Malayalam film director and writer